Apexart is a non-profit art space located in Manhattan, New York, that focuses on challenging the gallery system and democratizing the process by which art is curated and exhibited. The organization was founded by Steven Rand in 1994.

History 
Steve Rand created Apexart in 1994, with the mission to "facilitate independent curators by providing a space for experimentation."

Exhibition program 
An Apexart season consists of nine exhibitions in total: five at Apexart NYC, and four in temporary venues throughout the world. Apexart's exhibition program seeks to put new people in the position of "curator" through three different initiatives: the Invited Curator Series, the Unsolicited Proposal Program, and the Franchise Program.

Each year, Apexart presents two exhibitions organized by invited individuals, three exhibitions selected through the Unsolicited Proposal Program, and four exhibitions selected from the Franchise Program. The last two programs are open-call curatorial opportunities that allow anyone from anywhere to propose an exhibition to be presented by Apexart at its Tribeca location (in the case of the Unsolicited Proposal Program), or elsewhere in the world (in the case of the Franchise Program). The open-call applications are processed by a panel of over 400 jurors, that anyone can join.

Past invited curators include: David Bianculli, Leah Buechley, Dan Kois, Rob Walker, Greg Allen, Simon Critchley, David Byrne, Boris Groys, and Dave Eggers.

Past Unsolicited Proposal Winners include: Alastair Noble (2014), Avi Lubin (2014), Martin Waldmeier (2013), Natalie Musteata (2012), Gary Fogelson and Michael Hutcherson (2011), Courtenay Finn (2010) and Sandra Skurvida (2009).

Past Franchise winners include: Chuong-Dai Vo (Cambodia, 2014), Paul Falzone and Marisa Morán Jahn (Uganda, 2013), Katharina Rhode (South Africa, 2012), Corina Oprea, Isabel Löfgren, Judith Souriau, Milena Placentile, Valerio Del Baglivo (Sweden, 2011) and Logan Bay (Thailand, 2010).

Residency program 
The Apexart Residency is an alternative educational program that invites creative professionals to leave their familiar surrounding and stay for a month in another country. Inbound Residents travel to New York, while Outbound Residents are sent from New York to international locations including Ethiopia, Thailand and Brazil.

Public program 
To complement its exhibitions and residency, each year Apexart presents approximately 30 events that are designed to contextualize its activities for the audience and provide opportunities for artists, curators and cultural thinkers who wish to join the conversation.

Publications 

Apexart's publishing program examines timely issues in contemporary art and culture with new essays by members of the field from around the world.

In 2006, Apexart published its first book, On Cultural Influence: Collected Papers from Apexart International Conferences.

Its second book, Cautionary tales: Critical Curating, was published in 2007.

Apexart's third book, Playing by the Rules: Alternative Thinking/Alternative Spaces, was published in 2010. This book addresses the rules of development and maintaining "alternative spaces." It also provides perspectives for those working in "alternative spaces," by identifying trends of standardization in inherently "alternative" gathering places. 

Apexart's fourth book, Life Between Borders: The Nomadic Life of Curators and Artists, a collection of essays on the nomadic nature of participants in the art world, was published in 2013.

The Apexart Fellowship: an Experiment in Vertical Cultural Integration, was published in 2017.

Founder 
Steven Rand is an artist and the Founding Executive Director of Apexart.  He received an MFA from the University of Arizona in 1976. Rand's artwork has been exhibited in galleries and museums throughout Europe, Asia, and the United States, including The Permanent Light Installation for the European Patent Regional Office in Munich, Germany.

His work has been presented at the 49th Venice Biennale, the Pusan Biennial, and is currently in numerous private collections. 

He has exhibited with Mark Pasek Gallery (New York), Wschodnia Gallery (Lodz), Awangarda Gallery (Wroclaw), DDM warehouse Gallery (Shanghai), Biblioteca Luis Angel Arango (Bogotá), Ruth Benzacar Gallery (Buenos Aires), White Columns (New York), and has been represented by Schueppenhauer Galerie (Cologne) in Germany. 

Rand is also an internationally recognized lecturer, having lectured in places like Seoul Art Space Geumcheon, Residency Unlimited, College Arts Association, The Contemporary Art Museum, Espao AGORA/CAPACETE and BWA Wroclaw-Galerie Sztuki Wspolczensnej.

References

External links
 Apexart homepage

Art galleries established in 1994
Art museums and galleries in Manhattan
1994 establishments in New York City
Arts centers in New York City